Frankford Plains Cemetery is a cemetery located in Frankford Township in Sussex County, New Jersey in the United States. Founded in 1927, it is located on Plains Road in Frankford. The site of the cemetery was once home to a church of timber construction.

Notable burials
 Russ Van Atta (1906–1986), Major League Baseball pitcher (New York Yankees, St. Louis Browns), Sussex County Sheriff (1941–1944)

References

External links
 

Cemeteries in Sussex County, New Jersey
Frankford Township, New Jersey